Al-Qadi is an Arabic surname, it may refer to:

 Abd al-Majeed al-Qadi, Yemeni playwright and writer
 Ahmad Ibn al-Qadi, Moroccan writer
 Ayad Alkadhi, Iraqi artist
 Isam al-Qadi, Palestinian politician
 Fayez Rashid Ahmed Hassan Al-Qadi Banihammad, Hijacker Of United Airlines Flight 175. See Fayez Banihammad
 Naif Al-Qadi, Saudi footballer
 Yasin al-Qadi, Saudi businessman and terror suspect
 Qadi Ayyad,  (1083–1149) an Imam and later judge of the Almoravid Empire 

Arabic-language surnames